The 1998 Atlantic 10 Conference Baseball Championship was held at Veterans Stadium in Philadelphia, Pennsylvania on May 12. It was scheduled to be a double-elimination tournament held at Bear Stadium in Boyertown, Pennsylvania, where it had been held from 1987 to 1997. Rain, however, forced the league to move it to the Phillies' Veterans Stadium and change it to a one-day, single-elimination tournament. It featured the top two regular-season finishers of each of the conference's six-team divisions. East Division second seed Fordham defeated Virginia Tech in the title game to win the tournament for the first time, earning the Atlantic 10's automatic bid to the 1998 NCAA Tournament.

Seeding and format 
Each division's top teams, based on winning percentage in the 18-game regular season schedule, qualified for the field. In the four-team single-elimination format forced by rain, the East Division champion opened by playing the West Division runner-up, and vice versa.

Bracket

All-Tournament Team 
The following players were named to the All-Tournament Team. Fordham third baseman Tom Stein, one of four Rams selected, was named Most Outstanding Player.

The three Virginia Tech players selected, catcher Barry Gauch, pitcher Jon Hand, and second baseman Randy Martin, were all second-time selections. Hand was selected in 1996. Gauch and Martin were both selected in 1997, when Gauch was also named Most Outstanding Player.

Notes 

 With the tournament being moved to Veterans Stadium this was the first conference baseball tournament to be held in an MLB stadium.

References 

Atlantic 10 Conference tournament
Atlantic 10 Conference Baseball Tournament
Atlantic 10 Conference baseball tournament
Atlantic 10 Conference baseball tournament
1990s in Philadelphia
Baseball in Philadelphia
College sports in Pennsylvania
Sports competitions in Philadelphia